Montfortista excentrica is a species of sea snail, a marine gastropod mollusk in the family Fissurellidae, the keyhole limpets and slit limpets.

Description
The size of the shell typically varies between six and eighteen millimetres.

Distribution
This marine species occurs in the Central Indo-West Pacific; off Queensland, Northern Territory, Western Australia, Gulf of Carpentaria, Australia.

References

 Wilson, B., 1993. Australian Marine Shells. Prosobranch Gastropods. Odyssey Publishing, Kallaroo, WA

External links
 To World Register of Marine Species
 

Fissurellidae
Gastropods described in 1929